The 2013–14 Los Angeles Clippers season is the 44th season of the franchise in the National Basketball Association (NBA), their 36th season in Southern California, and their 30th season in Los Angeles. The team finished with a franchise record of 57-25, earning them the 3rd seed in the Western Conference.

In the playoffs, the Clippers defeated the Golden State Warriors in seven games in the First Round, but lost to the Oklahoma City Thunder in six games in the Semi-finals.

Key dates
 June 27, 2013: The 2013 NBA draft took place at Barclays Center in Brooklyn, New York.
 April 2, 2014: The Clippers win their second Pacific Division championship, defeating the Suns in Phoenix, 112-108.
 April 29, 2014: After being exposed making controversial and racial remarks to a female friend via an audio recording, owner Donald Sterling is banned for life from the NBA by commissioner Adam Silver.  Sterling was also fined $2.5 million for his remarks, and he and his family subsequently sold the team to former Microsoft CEO Steve Ballmer in August 2014.

Draft picks

Roster

Roster notes
 Coach Glenn "Doc" Rivers played for the franchise as its starting point guard in the 1991–1992 NBA season.
 This will be Alvin Gentry's second stint as an assistant coach for the Clippers.  He was also head coach of the team from 2000 to 2003.
 Assistant coach Armond Hill played for the franchise back in 1982 when they were still the San Diego Clippers.
 Assistant coach Tyronn Lue previously played for the crosstown rival Lakers from 1998 to 2001.
 Forward Antawn Jamison and guards Darius Morris & Sasha Vujacic become the 21st, 22nd and 23rd former Lakers to play for the Clippers.  All three players failed to stay as Clippers for the whole season.

Pre-season

|- style="background:#cfc;"
| 1
| October 7
| @ Portland
| 
| DeAndre Jordan (16)
| Jordan & Paul (8)
| Chris Paul (5)
| Moda Center12,849
| 1–0
|- style="background:#cfc;"
| 2
| October 12
| @ Utah
| 
| Byron Mullens (15)
| DeAndre Jordan (7)
| Paul & Collison (10)
| EnergySolutions Arena17,924
| 2–0
|- style="background:#fcc;"
| 3
| October 14
| @ Sacramento
| 
| Jamal Crawford (25)
| Byron Mullens (7)
| Darren Collison (10)
| Sleep Train Arena12,122
| 2–1
|- style="background:#cfc;"
| 4
| October 15
| @ Phoenix
| 
| Chris Paul (24)
| DeAndre Jordan (11)
| Chris Paul (9)
| US Airways Center11,516
| 3–1
|- style="background:#fcc;"
| 5
| October 18
| Portland
| 
| Darren Collison (31)
| Griffin, Jordan, & Jamison (6)
| Darren Collison (6)
| Staples Center14,849
| 3–2
|- style="background:#cfc;"
| 6
| October 19
| Denver
| 
| Chris Paul (40)
| Blake Griffin (8)
| Chris Paul (11)
| Mandalay Bay Events Center9,535
| 4–2
|- style="background:#cfc;"
| 7
| October 23
| Utah
| 
| Jamal Crawford (16)
| DeAndre Jordan (7)
| Chris Paul (10)
| Staples Center13,611
| 5–2
|- style="background:#fcc;"
| 8
| October 25
| Sacramento
| 
| Chris Paul (23)
| DeAndre Jordan (9)
| Jamal Crawford (6)
| Staples Center15,082
| 5–3

Regular season

Standings

Game log

|- style="background:#fcc;"
| 1
| October 29
| @ L.A. Lakers
| 
| Blake Griffin (19)
| DeAndre Jordan (11)
| Chris Paul (11)
| Staples Center18,997
| 0–1
|- style="background:#cfc;"
| 2
| October 31
| Golden State
| 
| Chris Paul (42)
| DeAndre Jordan (17)
| Chris Paul (15)
| Staples Center19,060
| 1–1

|- style="background:#cfc;"
| 3
| November 1
| @ Sacramento
| 
| Chris Paul (26)
| Blake Griffin (17)
| Chris Paul (10)
| Sleep Train Arena17,317
| 2–1
|- style="background:#cfc;"
| 4
| November 4
| Houston
| 
| JJ Redick (26)
| DeAndre Jordan (9)
| Chris Paul (17)
| Staples Center19,404
| 3–1
|- style="background:#fcc;"
| 5
| November 6
| @ Orlando
| 
| Blake Griffin (23)
| DeAndre Jordan (19)
| Chris Paul (10)
| Amway Center15,807
| 3–2
|- style="background:#fcc;"
| 6
| November 7
| @ Miami
| 
| Blake Griffin (27)
| Griffin & Jordan (14)
| Chris Paul (12)
| American Airlines Arena19,600
| 3–3
|- style="background:#cfc;"
| 7
| November 9
| @ Houston
| 
| Griffin & Redick (22)
| DeAndre Jordan (18)
| Chris Paul (13)
| Toyota Center18,108
| 4–3
|- style="background:#cfc;"
| 8
| November 11
| Minnesota
| 
| Blake Griffin (25)
| DeAndre Jordan (11)
| Chris Paul (11)
| Staples Center19,060
| 5–3
|- style="background:#cfc;"
| 9
| November 13
| Oklahoma City
| 
| Blake Griffin (22)
| Blake Griffin (12)
| Chris Paul (16)
| Staples Center19,273
| 6–3
|- style="background:#cfc;"
| 10
| November 16
| Brooklyn
| 
| Blake Griffin (30)
| DeAndre Jordan (16)
| Chris Paul (13)
| Staples Center19,349
| 7–3
|- style="background:#fcc;"
| 11
| November 18
| Memphis
| 
| Blake Griffin (23)
| DeAndre Jordan (16)
| Chris Paul (11)
| Staples Center19,060
| 7–4
|- style="background:#cfc;"
| 12
| November 20
| @ Minnesota
| 
| Griffin & Paul (20)
| DeAndre Jordan (12)
| Chris Paul (11)
| Target Center13,101
| 8–4
|- style="background:#fcc;"
| 13
| November 21
| @ Oklahoma City
| 
| Blake Griffin (27)
| DeAndre Jordan (12)
| Chris Paul (12)
| Chesapeake Energy Arena18,203
| 8–5
|- style="background:#cfc;"
| 14
| November 23
| Sacramento
| 
| Chris Paul (22)
| DeAndre Jordan (12)
| Chris Paul (9)
| Staples Center19,060
| 9–5
|- style="background:#cfc;"
| 15
| November 24
| Chicago
| 
| Jared Dudley (21)
| Blake Griffin (12)
| Chris Paul (17)
| Staples Center19,245
| 10–5
|- style="background:#cfc;"
| 16
| November 27
| New York
| 
| Blake Griffin (15)
| Blake Griffin (13)
| Chris Paul (7)
| Staples Center19,270
| 11–5
|- style="background:#cfc;"
| 17
| November 29
| @ Sacramento
| 
| Jamal Crawford (31)
| DeAndre Jordan (15)
| Jamal Crawford (11)
| Sleep Train Arena17,317
| 12–5

|- style="background:#fcc;"
| 18
| December 1
| Indiana
| 
| Jamal Crawford (20)
| Blake Griffin (12)
| Chris Paul (10)
| Staples Center19,060
| 12–6
|- style="background:#fcc;"
| 19
| December 4
| @ Atlanta
| 
| Blake Griffin (24)
| DeAndre Jordan (13)
| Chris Paul (11)
| Philips Arena12,020
| 12–7
|- style="background:#cfc;"
| 20
| December 5
| @ Memphis
| 
| Chris Paul (15)
| DeAndre Jordan (14)
| Chris Paul (8)
| FedExForum15,112
| 13–7
|- style="background:#fcc;"
| 21
| December 7
| @ Cleveland
| 
| Jamal Crawford (19)
| DeAndre Jordan (13)
| Chris Paul (15)
| Quicken Loans Arena16,216
| 13–8
|- style="background:#cfc;"
| 22
| December 9
| @ Philadelphia
| 
| Blake Griffin (26)
| DeAndre Jordan (21)
| Chris Paul (13)
| Wells Fargo Center12,355
| 14–8
|- style="background:#cfc;"
| 23
| December 11
| @ Boston
| 
| Chris Paul (22)
| Blake Griffin (7)
| Chris Paul (9)
| TD Garden17,587
| 15–8
|- style="background:#fcc;"
| 24
| December 12
| @ Brooklyn
| 
| Chris Paul (20)
| DeAndre Jordan (12)
| Blake Griffin (3)
| Barclays Center15,563
| 15–9
|- style="background:#cfc;"
| 25
| December 14
| @ Washington
| 
| Chris Paul (38)
| DeAndre Jordan (10)
| Chris Paul (12)
| Verizon Center16,509
| 16–9
|- style="background:#cfc;"
| 26
| December 16
| San Antonio
| 
| Blake Griffin (27)
| DeAndre Jordan (11)
| Chris Paul (7)
| Staples Center19,253
| 17–9
|- style="background:#cfc;"
| 27
| December 18
| New Orleans
| 
| Blake Griffin (21)
| DeAndre Jordan (20)
| Chris Paul (11)
| Staples Center19,060
| 18–9
|- style="background:#cfc;"
| 28
| December 21
| Denver
| 
| Jamal Crawford (27)
| Blake Griffin (16)
| Chris Paul (11)
| Staples Center19,129
| 19–9
|- style="background:#cfc;"
| 29
| December 22
| Minnesota
| 
| Blake Griffin (32)
| DeAndre Jordan (17)
| Chris Paul (13)
| Staples Center19,304
| 20–9
|- style="background:#fcc;"
| 30
| December 25
| @ Golden State
| 
| Chris Paul (26)
| Blake Griffin (14)
| Chris Paul (11)
| Oracle Arena19,596
| 20–10
|- style="background:#fcc;"
| 31
| December 26
| @ Portland
| 
| Blake Griffin (35)
| DeAndre Jordan (19)
| Chris Paul (16)
| Moda Center20,053
| 20-11
|- style="background:#cfc;"
| 32
| December 28
| Utah
| 
| Blake Griffin (40)
| DeAndre Jordan (12)
| Chris Paul (9)
| Staples Center19,278
| 21-11
|- style="background:#fcc;"
| 33
| December 30
| Phoenix
| 
| Jamal Crawford & Blake Griffin (15)
| DeAndre Jordan (19)
| Chris Paul (7)
| Staples Center19,278
| 21-12

|- style="background:#cfc;"
| 34
| January 1
| Charlotte
| 
| Blake Griffin (31)
| Blake Griffin & DeAndre Jordan (12)
| Chris Paul (14)
| Staples Center19,160
| 22-12
|- style="background:#cfc;"
| 35
| January 3
| @ Dallas
| 
| DeAndre Jordan & Blake Griffin (25)
| DeAndre Jordan (18)
| Chris Paul (6)
| American Airlines Center20,187
| 23-12
|- style="background:#fcc;"
| 36
| January 4
| @ San Antonio
| 
| Jamal Crawford (24)
| DeAndre Jordan (10)
| Jamal Crawford (7)
| AT&T Center18,581
| 23-13
|- style="background:#cfc;"
| 37
| January 6
| Orlando
| 
| Darren Collison (21)
| DeAndre Jordan (17)
| Jamal Crawford (8)
| Staples Center19,060
| 24-13
|- style="background:#cfc;"
| 38
| January 8
| Boston
| 
| Blake Griffin (29)
| DeAndre Jordan (13)
| Blake Griffin (8)
| Staples Center19,214
| 25-13
|- style="background:#cfc;"
| 39
| January 10
| L.A. Lakers
| 
| Blake Griffin (33)
| Blake Griffin (12)
| Darren Collison (7)
| Staples Center19,316
| 26–13
|- style="background:#cfc;"
| 40
| January 15
| Dallas
| 
| JJ Redick (33)
| DeAndre Jordan (13)
| Darren Collison (10)
| Staples Center19,208
| 27–13
|- style="background:#cfc;"
| 41
| January 17
| @ New York
| 
| Blake Griffin (32)
| DeAndre Jordan (16)
| Darren Collison (7)
| Madison Square Garden19,812
| 28-13
|- style="background:#fcc;"
| 42
| January 18
| @ Indiana
| 
| Jamal Crawford (22)
| DeAndre Jordan (17)
| three players (4)
| Bankers Life Fieldhouse18,165
| 28-14
|- style="background:#cfc;"
| 43
| January 20
| @ Detroit
| 
| Jamal Crawford (26)
| DeAndre Jordan (21)
| Darren Collison & JJ Redick (6)
| Palace of Auburn Hills17,417
| 29-14
|- style="background:#fcc;"
| 44
| January 22
| @ Charlotte
| 
| Blake Griffin (27)
| DeAndre Jordan (20)
| Blake Griffin (6)
| Time Warner Cable Arena14,760
| 29-15
|- style="background:#cfc;"
| 45
| January 24
| @ Chicago
| 
| Blake Griffin (26)
| Blake Griffin (13)
| Blake Griffin (7)
| United Center21,755
| 30-15
|- style="background:#cfc;"
| 46
| January 25
| @ Toronto
| 
| Jamal Crawford (37)
| DeAndre Jordan (11)
| Jamal Crawford (11)
| Air Canada Centre19,800
| 31–15
|- style="background:#cfc;"
| 47
| January 27
| @ Milwaukee
| 
| Jamal Crawford (25)
| DeAndre Jordan (18)
| Darren Collison (7)
| BMO Harris Bradley Center11,126
| 32–15
|- style="background:#cfc;"
| 48
| January 29
| Washington
| 
| Blake Griffin (29)
| Deandre Jordan (17)
| Darren Collison (9)
| Staples Center19,060
| 33–15
|- style="background:#fcc;"
| 49
| January 30
| @ Golden State
| 
| Blake Griffin (27)
| Deandre Jordan (20)
| Darren Collison (5)
| Oracle Arena19,596
| 33–16

|- style="background:#cfc;"
| 50
| February 1
| Utah
| 
| Jamal Crawford (27)
| Deandre Jordan (14)
| Darren Collison (6)
| Staples Center19,060
| 34-16
|- style="background:#fcc;"
| 51
| February 3
| @ Denver
| 
| Blake Griffin (36)
| Deandre Jordan (12)
| Darren Collison (6)
| Pepsi Center16,567
| 34-17
|- style="background:#fcc;"
| 52
| February 5
| Miami
| 
| Blake Griffin (43)
| Deandre Jordan (16)
| Darren Collison (9)
| Staples Center19,672
| 34-18
|- style="background:#cfc;"
| 53
| February 7
| Toronto
| 
| Blake Griffin (36)
| Deandre Jordan (13)
| Darren Collison (7)
| Staples Center19,060
| 35-18
|- style="background:#cfc;"
| 54
| February 9
| Philadelphia
| 
| Blake Griffin (26)
| Deandre Jordan (20)
| Chris Paul (8)
| Staples Center19,157
| 36-18
|- style="background:#cfc;"
| 55
| February 12
| Portland
| 
| Blake Griffin (36)
| Blake Griffin (10)
| Chris Paul (12)
| Staples Center19,175
| 37-18
|- align="center"
|colspan="9" bgcolor="#bbcaff"|All-Star Break
|- style="background:#fcc;"
| 56
| February 18
| San Antonio
| 
| Blake Griffin (35)
| Deandre Jordan (18)
| Chris Paul (9)
| Staples Center19,257
| 37-19
|- style="background:#fcc;"
| 57
| February 21
| @ Memphis
| 
| Blake Griffin (28)
| Blake Griffin (13)
| Chris Paul (14)
| FedExForum17,963
| 37-20
|- style="background:#cfc;"
| 58
| February 23
| @ Oklahoma City
| 
| Jamal Crawford (36)
| Deandre Jordan (12)
| Chris Paul (12)
| Chesapeake Energy Arena18,203
| 38-20
|- style="background:#cfc;"
| 59
| February 24
| @ New Orleans
| 
| Jamal Crawford (24)
| Deandre Jordan (16)
| Chris Paul (13)
| Smoothie King Center16,185
| 39-20
|- style="background:#cfc;"
| 60
| February 26
| Houston
| 
| Blake Griffin (23)
| Blake Griffin (16)
| Chris Paul (9)
| Staples Center19,258
| 40-20

|- style="background:#cfc;"
| 61
| March 1
| New Orleans
| 
| Chris Paul (21)
| DeAndre Jordan (12)
| Chris Paul (8)
| Staples Center19,060
| 41–20
|- style="background:#cfc;"
| 62
| March 4
| @ Phoenix
| 
| Matt Barnes (28)
| DeAndre Jordan (17)
| Chris Paul (9)
| US Airways Center15,068
| 42-20
|- style="background:#cfc;"
| 63
| March 6
| @ L.A. Lakers
| 
| Darren Collison (24)
| Jordan & Barnes (12)
| Chris Paul (11)
| Staples Center18,488
| 43-20
|- style="background:#cfc;"
| 64
| March 8
| Atlanta
| 
| Blake Griffin (27)
| DeAndre Jordan (12)
| Chris Paul (10)
| Staples Center19,178
| 44-20
|- style="background:#cfc;"
| 65
| March 10
| Phoenix
| 
| Blake Griffin (37)
| DeAndre Jordan (17)
| Chris Paul (11)
| Staples Center19,226
| 45-20
|- style="background:#cfc;"
| 66
| March 12
| Golden State
| 
| Blake Griffin (30)
| Blake Griffin (15)
| Chris Paul (12)
| Staples Center19,570
| 46-20
|- style="background:#cfc;"
| 67
| March 14
| @ Utah
| 
| Blake Griffin (20)
| DeAndre Jordan (10)
| Chris Paul (7)
| EnergySolutions Arena19,381
| 47-20
|- style="background:#cfc;"
| 68
| March 16
| Cleveland
| 
| Blake Griffin (21)
| Jordan &  Griffin (11)
| Chris Paul (15)
| Staples Center19,274
| 48-20
|- style="background:#fcc;"
| 69
| March 17
| @ Denver
| 
| Chris Paul (29)
| Blake Griffin (12)
| Chris Paul (7)
| Pepsi Center16,553
| 48-21
|- style="background:#cfc;"
| 70
| March 22
| Detroit
| 
| Chris Paul (28)
| DeAndre Jordan (12)
| Chris Paul (15)
| Staples Center19,214
| 49–21
|- style="background:#cfc;"
| 71
| March 24
| Milwaukee
| 
| Blake Griffin (27)
| Blake Griffin (14)
| Chris Paul (7)
| Staples Center19,060
| 50-21
|- style="background:#fcc;"
| 72
| March 26
| @ New Orleans
| 
| Jamal Crawford (31)
| DeAndre Jordan (16)
| Chris Paul (12)
| Smoothie King Center16,363
| 50-22
|- style="background:#cfc;"
| 73
| March 27
| @ Dallas
| 
| Chris Paul (31)
| DeAndre Jordan (15)
| Chris Paul (9)
| American Airlines Center19,912
| 51-22
|- style="background:#cfc;"
| 74
| March 29
| @ Houston
| 
| Chris Paul (30)
| DeAndre Jordan (12)
| Chris Paul (12)
| Toyota Center18,337
| 52-22
|- style="background:#cfc;"
| 75
| March 31
| @ Minnesota
| 
| Darren Collison (28)
| DeAndre Jordan (24)
| Chris Paul (9)
| Target Center12,172
| 53-22

|- style="background:#cfc;"
| 76
| April 2
| @ Phoenix
| 
| Griffin & Collison (23)
| DeAndre Jordan (11)
| Chris Paul (9)
| US Airways Center16,091
| 54-22
|- style="background:#fcc;"
| 77
| April 3
| Dallas
| 
| Blake Griffin (25)
| DeAndre Jordan (15)
| Blake Griffin (11)
| Staples Center19,222
| 54-23
|- style="background:#cfc;"
| 78
| April 6
| L.A. Lakers
| 
| Griffin & Paul (23)
| DeAndre Jordan (12)
| Paul & Collison (6)
| Staples Center19,239
| 55-23
|- style="background:#fcc;"
| 79
| April 9
| Oklahoma City
| 
| Blake Griffin (30)
| Griffin & Jordan (12)
| Paul & Redick (8)
| Staples Center19,459
| 55-24
|- style="background:#cfc;"
| 80
| April 12
| Sacramento
| 
| Blake Griffin (27)
| DeAndre Jordan (9)
| Chris Paul (10)
| Staples Center19,060
| 56–24
|- style="background:#cfc;"
| 81
| April 15
| Denver
| 
| Blake Griffin (24)
| DeAndre Jordan (16)
| Chris Paul (10)
| Staples Center19,330
| 57–24
|- style="background:#fcc;"
| 82
| April 16
| @ Portland
| 
| Jamal Crawford (34)
| Matt Barnes (8)
| Jamal Crawford (8)
| Moda Center20,021
| 57–25

Playoffs

Game log

|- style="background:#fcc;"
| 1
| April 19
| Golden State
| 
| Chris Paul (28)
| DeAndre Jordan (14)
| Chris Paul (8)
| Staples Center19,339
| 0–1
|- style="background:#cfc;"
| 2
| April 21
| Golden State
| 
| Blake Griffin (35)
| DeAndre Jordan (9)
| Paul, Collison (10)
| Staples Center19,570
| 1–1
|- style="background:#cfc;"
| 3
| April 24
| @ Golden State
| 
| Blake Griffin (32)
| DeAndre Jordan (22)
| Chris Paul (10)
| Oracle Arena19,596
| 2–1
|- style="background:#fcc;"
| 4
| April 27
| @ Golden State
| 
| Jamal Crawford (26)
| Griffin, Jordan (6)
| Chris Paul (6)
| Oracle Arena19,596
| 2–2
|- style="background:#cfc;"
| 5
| April 29
| Golden State
| 
| DeAndre Jordan (25)
| DeAndre Jordan (18)
| Chris Paul (7)
| Staples Center19,657
| 3–2
|- style="background:#fcc;"
| 6
| May 1
| @ Golden State
| 
| Jamal Crawford (19)
| DeAndre Jordan (19)
| Chris Paul (8)
| Oracle Arena19,596
| 3–3
|- style="background:#cfc;"
| 7
| May 3
| Golden State
| 
| Blake Griffin (24)
| DeAndre Jordan (18)
| Chris Paul (14)
| Staples Center19,543
| 4–3

|- style="background:#cfc;"
| 1
| May 5
| @ Oklahoma City
| 
| Chris Paul (32)
| Griffin, Jordan, Granger (24)
| Chris Paul (10)
| Chesapeake Energy Arena18,203
| 1–0
|- style="background:#fcc;"
| 2
| May 7
| @ Oklahoma City
| 
| JJ Redick (18)
| DeAndre Jordan (8)
| Chris Paul (11)
| Chesapeake Energy Arena18,203
| 1–1
|- style="background:#fcc;"
| 3
| May 9
| Oklahoma City
| 
| Blake Griffin (34)
| DeAndre Jordan (11)
| Chris Paul (16)
| Staples Center19,530
| 1–2
|- style="background:#cfc;"
| 4
| May 11
| Oklahoma City
| 
| Blake Griffin (25)
| DeAndre Jordan (14)
| Chris Paul (10)
| Staples Center19,365
| 2–2
|- style="background:#fcc;"
| 5
| May 13
| @ Oklahoma City
| 
| Blake Griffin (24)
| Blake Griffin (17)
| Chris Paul (14)
| Chesapeake Energy Arena18,203
| 2–3
|- style="background:#fcc;"
| 6
| May 15
| Oklahoma City
| 
| Chris Paul (25)
| DeAndre Jordan (15)
| Chris Paul (11)
| Staples Center19,565
| 2–4

Injuries and surgeries

Transactions

Trades

Free agents

Re-signed

Additions

Subtractions

References

Los Angeles Clippers seasons
Los Angeles Clippers